Hungarian Rhapsody is a 1979 Hungarian drama film directed by Miklós Jancsó. It was entered into the 1979 Cannes Film Festival. It won Golden Peacock (Best Film) at the 7th International Film Festival of India.

Cast
 György Cserhalmi as Zsadányi István
 Lajos Balázsovits as Zsadányi Gábor
 Gábor Koncz as Szeles-Tóth
 Udo Kier as Poór
 István Bujtor as Héderváry
 József Madaras as Baksa András
 Anikó Sáfár as Hanna
 Zsuzsa Czinkóczi as Eszter
 István Kovács as Komáry István gróf
 Imre Sarlai as Id. Zsadányi
 Anna Takács
 Djoko Rosic as (as Dzsoko Roszich)
 Rada Rassimov

References

External links

1979 films
1970s Hungarian-language films
1979 drama films
Films directed by Miklós Jancsó
Hungarian drama films